Troy Murphy (born June 13, 1992) is an American freestyle skier. He came in 17th in the Men's Moguls competition in the 2018 Winter Olympics. He's since achieved notoriety on social media for portraying a character named Donny Pelletier, an out-of-control hot dogger with a wicked Maine accent and a penchant for swilling Moxie.

References

1992 births
Living people
People from Bethel, Maine
Freestyle skiers at the 2018 Winter Olympics
American male freestyle skiers
Olympic freestyle skiers of the United States
21st-century American people